Salticus (from Latin “saltus” – leap or jump) is a genus of the family Salticidae (the jumping spiders). Salticus is the type genus for the family Salticidae.

Description

Coloration is determined by various scales (modified setae) covering a brown or black integument. Narrow scales (or hairs) may be black or red/rust colored, while broad scales are either iridescent (often magenta or green) or opaque granular white or yellow.

Several common species have a dorsal pattern of black narrow scales and white granular scales arranged in transverse stripes, especially on the abdomen, from which the common name “zebra spiders” originates, e.g. Holarctic Salticus scenicus (Clerck, 1757). Some Salticus species in the Southwestern US and Mexico have red and white transverse stripes on the abdomen, e.g. Salticus palpalis (Banks, 1904). Some lack the “zebra” stripes completely and have both dorsal abdomen and cephalothorax covered with iridescent scales, e.g. Salticus peckhamae (Cockerell, 1897). Since the dorsal coloration does not seem to be involved in the male’s courtship display the coloration may have been selected for camouflage or mimicry. For example, there is a strong similarity between S. palpalis and Agapostemon sweat bees.  

Salticus species range in length from 3-7 mm. Males are smaller than females, but have elongated chelicerae and pedipalps.

Habits
Like most Salticidae, they prefer open, sunny habitats They are often found on vertical surfaces including man-made structures such as walls and fences or natural such as tree trunks. They are commonly found near water, where they feast on emergent aquatic gnats and other insects. One study recorded dipterans as 70% of prey items. Salticus species have been observed preying on insects several times their body size.

Distribution
This genus has at least one species recorded from every continent except Antarctica. One common species, S. scenicus, is a widely distributed Holarctic species associated with human habitations. S. scenicus has the second most jumping spider observations on iNaturalist. Most other Salticus species have a more restricted distribution. Two areas with high species diversity are the Southwestern portion of the United States (into Mexico) and the Mediterranean. Four species have been recorded from the Canary Islands

Species

, the World Spider Catalog accepted these species:

Salticus afghanicus Logunov & Zamanpoore, 2005 – Afghanistan
Salticus aiderensis Logunov & Rakov, 1998 – Turkmenistan
Salticus alegranzaensis Wunderlich, 1995 – Canary Is.
Salticus annulatus (Giebel, 1870) – South Africa
Salticus austinensis Gertsch, 1936 – United States, Mexico, Central America
Salticus beneficus (O. Pickard-Cambridge, 1885) – China (Yarkand)
Salticus bonaerensis Holmberg, 1876 – Argentina
Salticus brasiliensis Lucas, 1833 – Brazil
Salticus canariensis Wunderlich, 1987 – Canary Is.
Salticus cingulatus (Panzer, 1797) – Europe, Turkey, Iran, Russia (Europe to Far East), Kazakhstan, Mongolia
Salticus confusus Lucas, 1846 – Portugal, Spain, France (Corsica), Bulgaria, Greece (Crete), Algeria
Salticus conjonctus (Simon, 1868) – France, Italy
Salticus coronatus (Camboué, 1887) – Madagascar
Salticus devotus (O. Pickard-Cambridge, 1885) – China (Yarkand)
Salticus dzhungaricus Logunov, 1992 – Kazakhstan, Turkmenistan
Salticus falcarius (Hentz, 1846) – United States
Salticus flavicruris (Rainbow, 1897) – Australia (New South Wales)
Salticus gomerensis Wunderlich, 1987 – Canary Is.
Salticus insperatus Logunov, 2009 – Iran
Salticus iteacus Metzner, 1999 – Greece
Salticus jugularis Simon, 1900 – Australia (Queensland)
Salticus karakumensis Logunov & Ponomarev, 2020 – Turkmenistan
Salticus kraali (Thorell, 1878) – Indonesia (Ambon)
Salticus latidentatus Roewer, 1951 – Russia (South Siberia, Far East), Mongolia, China, Japan
Salticus lucasi Zamani, Hosseini & Moradmand, 2020 – Iran
Salticus major (Simon, 1868) – Portugal, Spain, France
Salticus mandibularis (Simon, 1868) – Greece
Salticus meticulosus Lucas, 1846 – Algeria
Salticus modicus (Simon, 1875) – France
Salticus mutabilis Lucas, 1846 – Europe, Savage Is., Azores, Morocco, Egypt, Georgia, Argentina
Salticus noordami Metzner, 1999 – Greece, Turkey, Cyprus, Israel, Iran
Salticus olivaceus (L. Koch, 1867) – Spain to Israel
Salticus palpalis (Banks, 1904) – United States, Mexico
Salticus paludivagus Lucas, 1846 – Algeria
Salticus peckhamae (Cockerell, 1897) – United States
Salticus perogaster (Thorell, 1881) – Papua New Guinea (Yule Is.)
Salticus propinquus Lucas, 1846 – Mediterranean
Salticus proszynskii Logunov, 1992 – Kyrgyzstan, Kazakhstan
Salticus quagga Miller, 1971 – Hungary, Slovakia
Salticus ravus (Bösenberg, 1895) – Canary Is.
Salticus ressli Logunov, 2015 – Turkey
Salticus scenicus (Clerck, 1757) (type species) – North America, Europe, Russia (Europe to Far East), Caucasus, Kazakhstan, Iran
Salticus scitulus (Simon, 1868) – France (Corsica)
Salticus tricinctus (C. L. Koch, 1846) – Mediterranean to Central Asia, Afghanistan
Salticus truncatus Simon, 1937 – France
Salticus turkmenicus Logunov & Rakov, 1998 – Turkmenistan
Salticus unciger (Simon, 1868) – Southern Europe
Salticus unicolor (Simon, 1868) – Greece (Corfu)
Salticus zebraneus (C. L. Koch, 1837) – Europe, Turkey, Russia (Europe, Caucasus), Iran

References

Further reading
Murphy, Frances & Murphy, John (2000): An Introduction to the Spiders of South East Asia. Malaysian Nature Society, Kuala Lumpur.

External links

 Dr. Heiko Metzner's Worldwide Database of Jumping Spiders (includes descriptions, distribution maps, drawings/photos for most species listed in the World Spider Catalog) 
 Video of Salticus scenicus 

Salticidae
Salticidae genera
Articles containing video clips
Cosmopolitan spiders

ro:Salticinae